Tihočaj is a settlement in the Jastrebarsko administrative area of Zagreb County, Croatia. As of 2021 it has a population of 1.

References

Populated places in Zagreb County